McAllen Heart Hospital is a 60-bed cardiovascular disease hospital in McAllen, Texas.  It was the  freestanding heart hospital in the United States

The hospital provides comprehensive inpatient and outpatient cardiac care, a 24-hour Emergency Center, General and Weight Loss Surgery programs.   It serves McAllen and the surrounding communities in The Rio Grande Valley.

Emergency medicine 
The McAllen Heart hospital has advanced imaging technology, such as the Optical Coherence Tomography.  It also has an outpatient congestive heart failure program .

Affiliation 
McAllen Heart Hospital is owned and operated by a subsidiary of Universal Health Services, Inc..

Awards and Accolades
 Received full Cycle II Chest Pain Center Accreditation with PCI (Percutaneous Coronary Interventions) from the Society of Chest Pain Centers Accreditation Review Committee in March 2009.
 Certified as a disease specific care Primary Stroke Center and certified as a Center of Excellence for Bariatric Surgery.

References

Hospitals in Texas
1996 establishments in Texas
Buildings and structures in McAllen, Texas